Oscar "Richard" Serag Garin Jr. (born December 11, 1967)  is a Filipino politician and civil engineer serving as the mayor of Miagao since 2022. He was previously the Representative of Iloilo's 1st district, Vice Governor of Iloilo, member of Iloilo's provincial board, and Mayor of Guimbal.

Education 
Richard Garin is a civil engineer by profession. He finished his studies at the University of San Agustin in 1990 and passed the Board Examinations for Civil Engineers given that same year.

He's also an alumni member of Central Philippine University.

Political career 
His career in politics started in 1982 when he was elected as Guimbal Municipal Federation President of the Kabataang Barangay, the precursor of the present day Sangguniang Kabataan. At 24 years old, he was elected in 1992 as Provincial Board Member, representing the First District of Iloilo and was re-elected to the same position in 1995. In 1998 he opted out on his last term as Board Member to become the Municipal Mayor of Guimbal, Iloilo which he served until 2007.

He returned to the Sangguniang Panlalawigan as a Senior Board Member and Floor Leader in 2007. He was elected Vice Governor of the Province of Iloilo in 2010 elections with a margin of about 180,000 votes.

He authored legislations providing social pensions for indigent senior citizens who are at least 70 years old, and the establishment of independent high schools in the country. He has filed several bills in Congress, among the most significant and important are House Bills 2147, 3417, 3418 and 3420. When he was Vice Governor of Iloilo from 2010 to 2013, he also promoted similar social legislations, like the Senior Citizens Ordinance of 2012, Person with Disability Ordinance of 2012 and the Solo Parents Ordinance of 2013.  

In 2021, he transferred his voter's registration to Miagao, where outgoing mayor Macario Napulan is his political ally. In the 2022 election, he was elected mayor of Miagao.

Personal life 
He is the son of Oscar Garin Sr. and Ninfa Serag Garin. He is the older brother of Sharon and Christine Garin.

He is married to Janette Garin of Leyte, a doctor by profession, a former Secretary of the Department of Health (Philippines) and the incumbent Congresswoman of the First District of Iloilo. She was a Member of the House of Representatives for three terms, from 2004 to 2013. They have a daughter, Rica Jane, who is presently enrolled at Boston College as a Bachelor of Science in Economics student.

References 

Filipino civil engineers
PDP–Laban politicians
Members of the House of Representatives of the Philippines from Iloilo
1969 births
Living people